Rossoshansky is a rural locality (a settlement) in Basakinskoye Rural Settlement, Chernyshkovsky District, Volgograd Oblast, Russia. The population was 52 as of 2010. There are 3 streets.ref>Россошанский поселок на карте</ref>

Geography 
Rossoshansky is located 50 km south of Chernyshkovsky (the district's administrative centre) by road. Nizyanka is the nearest rural locality.

References 

Rural localities in Chernyshkovsky District